Kneehill County is a municipal district in central Alberta, Canada within Census Division No. 5.

Geography

Communities and localities 
The following urban municipalities are surrounded by Kneehill County:
Cities
none
Towns
Three Hills (location of municipal office)
Trochu
Villages
Acme
Carbon
Linden
Summer villages
none

The following hamlets are located within Kneehill County:
Hamlets
Bircham
Hesketh
Huxley
Sunnyslope
Swalwell
Torrington (dissolved from village status in December 1997)
Wimborne

The following localities are located within Kneehill County:
Localities 

Allingham
Bargrave
Beynon
Buoyant
Cosway
Curlew
Dunphy
Entice
Equity
Gatine
Ghost Pine

Ghost Pine Creek
Grainger
Helmer
Highland Ranch
Kirkpatrick
Perbeck
Sharples
Taylor
Tolman
Twining

Demographics 

In the 2016 Census of Population conducted by Statistics Canada, Kneehill County had a population of 5,001 living in 1,722 of its 1,859 total private dwellings, a  change from its 2011 population of 4,921.

See also 
List of communities in Alberta
List of municipal districts in Alberta

References

External links 

 
Municipal districts in Alberta